Baddour is a surname. Notable people with the surname include:

Anne Baddour (fl. 1988), American aviatrix
Phil Baddour (born 1942), American politician
Steven Baddour (born 1969), American attorney and politician